Henry Knollys may refer to:
Sir Henry Knollys (privateer) (c. 1542–1582), English privateer, courtier and MP for Reading and Oxfordshire
Henry Knollys (Portsmouth MP), MP for Portsmouth in 1547
Henry Knollys (politician, died 1583), MP for Grampound, New Shoreham, Guildford and Christchurch
Sir Henry Knollys, 1st Baronet (c. 1611–1648), of the Knollys baronets
Henry Knollys (St Ives MP) (1689–1747), MP for St Ives 1722–24
Sir Henry Knollys (British Army officer) (1840–1930), British Army officer and courtier